"In My Arms" is a synthpop ballad by British duo Erasure. Written by Vince Clarke and Andy Bell, the song was released in 1997, as the lead single from their eighth studio album, Cowboy. The album version was released as the single version in both the UK and the US, although the lead synthesizer melody performed during the song's middle eight section was mixed lower for the American version. It was issued by Mute Records in the UK and by Maverick Records in the US. The cover for the US single release was used as an example in the book The 7 Essentials of Graphic Design by Allison Goodman.

Critical reception
Ned Raggett from AllMusic stated that the song "has an attractive air to it, with a nicely sweeping chorus, but feels a little too relaxed, not as flat out energetic as it could be." Larry Flick from Billboard described it as a "sweet midtempo ballad", and noted that Love To Infinity has remixed the tune into "a festive disco anthem that will easily nudge it into the winner's circle of clubland and maybe even pop/crossover radio." He commented further that Andy Bell "is the picture of suave and soulful romance, displaying a mature way with words, while partner Vince Clarke is as shrewd a melody writer as ever." 

Ben Marshall from The Guardian complimented it as "pop at its purest", a "techno-ballad" and "great stuff". Chris Gerard from Metro Weekly wrote, "With lush keyboards and sublime vocal harmonies, "In My Arms" is one of Erasure's most beautiful singles." A reviewer from Music Week rated it two out of five, writing, "Rapidly losing their footing in the pop market, Andy and Vince cling to the old formula but, unless this is applied to more immediate pop material, the slide may continue."

Chart performance
The single peaked at number thirteen on the UK Singles Chart and stalled at number seventy-six in Germany — Erasure's lowest-charting single in that country up to that point. But in Hungary, it reached number-one, while it was a Top 10 hit in Finland. In the United States, it became Erasure's first Billboard Hot 100 entry since 1994's "Always", peaking at number fifty-five. Its remix was a big hit in dance clubs, peaking at number two on the US Hot Dance Music/Club Play chart. The song peaked at number 31. That was their final entry on both the Hot 100 and the Mainstream Top 40 charts.

Music video
A music video was produced to promote the single, directed by English music video and film director Dick Carruthers, and filmed on-stage and backstage at the New Theatre Oxford (known as The Apollo Theatre at the time). It premiered in the UK in January 1997 and was later published on Erasure's official YouTube channel in September 2014. The video has amassed more than 596,000 views as of October 2021.

Track listings

 Cassette single (CMUTE190)
 "In My Arms"
 "Rapture" (Chris Stein, Deborah Harry)

 12" single (12MUTE190)
 "In My Arms" (Love to Infinity Gyrator Club Mix)
 "In My Arms" (Love to Infinity Stratomaster Mix)
 "Rapture"

 CD single #1 (CDMUTE190)
 "In My Arms" (Single Mix)
 "In the Name of the Heart"
 "In My Arms" (Love to Infinity Stratomaster Mix)
 "In My Arms" (Crumbling Down Mix)

 CD single #2 (LCDMUTE190)
 "In My Arms" (Love to Infinity Gyrator Club Mix)
 "Rapture" (Matt Darey Mix)
 "Rapture"

 US maxi-single (9 43857-2)
 "In My Arms" (Love to Infinity Stratomaster Mix)
 "In My Arms" (Love to Infinity Gyrator Dub Mix)
 "In My Arms" (Love to Infinity Gyrator Club Mix)
 "In My Arms" (Crumbling Down Mix)
 "In My Arms" (U.S. version)

Charts

References

1997 singles
1997 songs
Erasure songs
Number-one singles in Hungary
Mute Records singles
Songs written by Vince Clarke
Songs written by Andy Bell (singer)
Song recordings produced by Gareth Jones